Berghia verrucicornis is a species of sea slug, an aeolid nudibranch. It is a shell-less marine gastropod mollusc in the family Aeolidiidae.

Distribution
This species was described from the Gulf of Naples, Italy. It is widespread in the Mediterranean Sea. On the eastern coasts of the North Atlantic Ocean Berghia verrucicornis is reported from the Bassin d"Arcachon south to Senegal and Ghana. Reports of this species from elsewhere appear to be of similar separate species, in particular Berghia stephanieae.

Description
This species has a maximum reported size of 20 mm.

Habitat 
This species is found in depths of 0 m to 11 m.

In the aquarium
The species from aquaria eating Aiptasia anemones has been called Berghia verrucicornis, but is actually the species Berghia stephanieae, which was described in 2005.

References

Aeolidiidae
Gastropods described in 1867
Taxa named by Achille Costa